Charles Alexander Smith (1864–1915) was a Canadian painter from Ontario.  He was professionally known as Charles Alexander.

See also 
Assemblée des six-comtés (painting)
List of Canadian painters
List of Canadian artists

External links
Gallery of paintings at artnet
Biography at askart

1864 births
1915 deaths
19th-century Canadian painters
Canadian male painters
20th-century Canadian painters
Artists from Ontario
19th-century Canadian male artists
20th-century Canadian male artists